Ousanas (fl. 320) was a King of Axum. S. C. Munro-Hay believes that it is "very likely" that Ousanas is the king to whom Aedesius and Frumentius were brought. In Ethiopian tradition, this king is called Ella Allada or Ella Amida. Ella Amida would then be his throne name, although Ousanas is the name that appears on his coins. If this identification is correct, then it was during his reign that Christianity was introduced to Axum and the surrounding territories.

Ousanas may have had a "relatively long reign" and campaigned in Nubia. It is also possible that he was briefly ousted by Wazeba, a usurper.

W.R.O. Hahn, in a study published in 1983, identifies Sembrouthes, who is known only from an inscription found in Daqqi Mahari in modern Eritrea, with Ousanas. If correct, this would give Ousanas a reign of at least 27 years.

Coins with the name of this ruler were found in the late 1990s at archaeological sites in India. The coins of Ousanas were lighter than those of his predecessors, likely due to Roman emperor Constantine I transferring lighter gold coins to the Eastern Roman Empire.

Coins of Ousanas usually bear the following inscriptions:
 Obverse: "OYCANAC ΒΑϹΙΛΕΥϹ" – "King Ousanas".
 Reverse: "AξωMITωNBI CIΓICENE" – "of the Aksumites, man of Gisene".

Some copper coins have an alternate reverse inscription:
 "Aξ+ ωMI" – "[of the] Aksum[ites]".

Notes 

Kings of Axum
4th-century monarchs in Africa